David Simons may refer to:

David G. Simons (1922–2010), American physician and U.S. Air Force officer who set a record of high-altitude balloon flight
J. David Simons (born 1953), Scottish novelist and short story writer
 David Simons, developer of Simons' BASIC
Dave Simons (1954–2009), American comic book artist
 D. Brenton Simons, president and CEO of the New England Historic Genealogical Society

See also  
 David Simon (disambiguation)
 David Simmons (disambiguation)